Laothus is a genus of butterflies in the family Lycaenidae. The members of this genus are found in the Neotropical realm.

External links
Funet Taxonomy Distribution

Eumaeini
Lycaenidae of South America
Lycaenidae genera